Christopher Billopp or Billop ( - 1725) was an English officer of the Royal Navy in the seventeenth century who commanded various ships of the line, including  in the Battle of Bantry Bay. He is noted as part of the "Staten Island Legend", a likely apocryphal story which describes Billopp's circumnavigation of Staten Island in a sailing race to claim it for New York. Though the legend has survived in oral tradition and popular culture since at least the 19th century, there is no concrete evidence that such a race actually occurred.

Family
Billopp's father was named William Billopp from Beverley in the East Riding of Yorkshire, England. His grandfather was Christopher Billopp (Mayor of Beverley) and great grandfather Johnis. He had a brother named Joseph, who resided in New York and London, England. He was married twice and had two daughters by his first wife, Mary, and Anne, his second wife was Katherine Farmar. Anne married Thomas Farmar.

Government service
In 1709, Billopp received a charter to operate the Perth Amboy Ferry, part of an important overland route between New York and Philadelphia. Billopp also served for a time as a lieutenant in command of an infantry detachment under colonial governor Edmund Andros.

Staten Island legend
A primary source describes Billopp's alleged role in securing Staten Island for New York. To settle a territorial dispute between New York and New Jersey, the Duke of York was said to have come up with a novel solution: he declared that all islands in New York Harbor that could be circumnavigated in 24 hours would belong to New York, and if such a voyage took longer than that, they would belong to New Jersey.

At this time, Billopp was just across the waterway from Staten Island at Perth Amboy, New Jersey aboard a small two-gun vessel called the Bentley. Billopp was selected for the duke's challenge. While struggling to figure out how to complete the more than  voyage within the duke's time frame of 24 hours, Billopp reasoned that if he packed the deck of his ship with empty barrels, the extra surface area could harness some more wind giving his ship a slight boost in speed. Thus equipped, Billopp completed the circumnavigation in just over 23 hours and secured Staten Island for New York. On this land, Billopp built his house, which he named the Manor of Bentley in honor of his ship.

While this anecdote has been widely repeated, including by Mayor of New York City Michael Bloomberg, reliable historical documentation of the event is extremely sparse, and most historians conclude that it is entirely apocryphal. In 2007, The New York Times addressed the issue in a news article, which concluded that this event was heavily embellished over the years and almost certainly originated in local folklore. YouTuber CGP Grey addressed the story of the Staten Island race and its historical discrepancies in a 2019 video.

Naval career

Billopp served in a number of Royal Naval vessels:
As lieutenant:

As captain:
 during the Battle of Barfleur

 during the Battle of Bantry Bay

: a 10 gun ketch
Prudent Mary; fire ship; commanded the ship on 11 August 1673 during the Battle of Texel during the Third Anglo-Dutch War. While attempting to get alongside the ship of the Dutch Admiral Cornelis Tromp, was grappled by a Dutch fireship, both burned together.

Crown grants and legacy
He built a stone manor house upon the land named "Bentley Manor", after the name of a small ship he had commanded, the Bentley.

In 1687, he received a second crown grant. Although land ownership went through several hands, including those of William Henry Aspinwall, the neighborhood retained the Bentley Manor name into the early 20th century. The house, inherited by his great grandson Colonel Christopher Billopp, a British Loyalist during the American Revolution, was the setting for a failed peace conference between Lord Howe and members of the Continental Congress. His house is now a United States National Historic Landmark known as the Conference House.

Billop Avenue in Tottenville, formerly known as Raritan Avenue, Avenue D and Depew Avenue, was named after Christopher Billopp.

References

Bibliography
The Londons of the British fleet, how they faced the enemy on the day of battle and what their story means for us to-day, Edward Fraser (1908), J. Lane (London)

1630s births
1726 deaths
Royal Navy officers
Royal Navy personnel of the Third Anglo-Dutch War
People of the Province of New York